Aigialomycin D is a macrolide antibiotic which is produced by the fungi Aigialus parvus. Aigialomycin D is a resorcylic acid lactone and has the molecular formula C18H22O6. Preliminary studies found that aigialomycin D is a protein kinase inhibitor with anti-tumor activity. Aigialomycin D has antimalarial activity.

References

Further reading 

 
 
 

Macrolide antibiotics
Heterocyclic compounds with 2 rings
Resorcinols